Nidec Leroy-Somer is a French company based in Angoulême, Charente which manufactures mainly electric motors. It was established in 1919 by Marcellin Leroy.

The firm has now expanded in Czech Republic, Hungary, Poland, Romania, China and India, with almost 10,000 employees.

Since January 31, 2017, Leroy-Somer has become a part of the Japanese Nidec Group.

References

External links 

Manufacturing companies established in 1919
Engineering companies of France
Industrial machine manufacturers
1919 establishments in France
French brands
2017 mergers and acquisitions

Electric motor manufacturers